is the 38th episode of the Pokémon anime's first season. Its sole broadcast was in Japan on December 16, 1997. 

In the episode, Ash and his friends find that there is something wrong with the Poké Ball transmitting device at the local Pokémon Center. To find out what is wrong, they must go inside the machine.

The episode contained repetitive visual effects that induced photosensitive epileptic seizures in a substantial number of Japanese viewers, with more than 700 children across Japan taken to hospitals. Additionally, the shares of Nintendo, the company that produced the games they were based on significantly fell.

As a result of the incident, the episode was pulled from rotation and it has not aired in any country since. After the incident, the Pokémon anime went into a four-month hiatus. Since then, the episode has been parodied and referenced in cultural media.

Plot
Ash, Misty, Brock and Pikachu make their way to the nearest Pokémon Center, where they discover that the Poké Ball transmitting device is malfunctioning. On Nurse Joy's request, they go to Professor Akihabara, the one who created the Poké Ball transfer system. He tells them that Team Rocket stole his prototype Porygon, a digital Pokémon that can exist in cyberspace, and is using it to steal trainers' Pokémon from inside the computer system.

Akihabara sends Ash, Misty, Brock, Pikachu and his second Porygon into the cyberspace system, using his Dimension Transporter, to stop Team Rocket, whom they learn have set up a blockade that stops Pokéballs from traveling the network. Porygon is able to defeat Team Rocket's Porygon; unfortunately, Nurse Joy, monitoring the situation and unaware that Ash and the others are inside, has sent an antivirus program into the system to combat the computer virus Team Rocket set up. In the ensuing chaos, Pikachu uses a Thunderbolt attack on the program, which manifests as 4 cyber missiles, which causes a large explosion. Two of the missiles enter the portal, completely destroying Akihabara's house, much to his dismay, as his Dimension Transporter is now broken. The group and Team Rocket successfully escape the computer, and with Team Rocket's blockade removed, the Poké Ball transmitting device returns to normal.

Broadcast
"Dennō Senshi Porygon" had its sole broadcast in Japan on Tuesday, December 16, 1997, at 6:30 PM Japan Standard Time (09:30 UTC). It was broadcast over 37 TV stations that Tuesday night. It held the highest ratings for its time slot, and was watched by approximately 4.6 million households.

Strobe lights

Twenty minutes into the episode, Pikachu stops "vaccine" missiles with his Thunderbolt attack, resulting in an explosion that flashes red and blue lights. Although there were similar parts in the episode with red and blue flashes, two anime techniques, called "paka paka" and "flash", made the scene particularly intense. These flashes were bright strobe lights, with blinks at a rate of about 12 Hz for approximately six seconds.

At this point, some of the viewers experienced blurred vision, headaches, dizziness and nausea. Some suffered seizures, blindness, convulsions and unconsciousness. Japan's Fire Defense Agency reported that 685 viewers – 310 boys and 375 girls – were taken to hospitals by ambulances. Although many victims recovered during the ambulance trip, more than 150 were admitted to hospitals. Two were hospitalized for more than two weeks. Some had seizures when parts of the scene were rebroadcast during news reports on the seizures.

Later studies showed that 5–10% of the viewers had mild symptoms that did not need hospital treatment. Twelve thousand children who were not sent to hospital reported mild symptoms of illness; however, their symptoms more closely resembled mass hysteria than a  seizure. A study following 103 patients over three years after the event found that most had no further seizures. Although approximately 1 in 4,000 people are susceptible to these types of seizures, the number of people affected by the Pokémon episode was unprecedented.

Shortly after the incident, speaking to USA Today, Mike Lazzo, vice president of programming for the Cartoon Network, reassured parents that American children were unlikely to suffer seizures provoked by cartoons as U.S. networks at the time rarely aired anime, which he argued was substantially different to animation aired on Cartoon Network. In early January 1998, 4Kids Entertainment announced that they intended to air Pokémon in the U.S., albeit ensuring that the flashing effects were removed. Electronic Gaming Monthly suggested that without the publicity around the seizures, Pokémon may have never been localized to the U.S. Pokémon successfully premiered in the U.S. (without this episode) in September 1998, with more children's anime airing on broadcast and cable networks in the U.S. immediately afterwards.

Aftermath

The following day, the television station that had originated the lone broadcast of that episode, TV Tokyo, issued an apology to the Japanese public, suspended the program, and said it would investigate the cause of the seizures. Video retailers all over Japan removed the Pokémon anime from their rental shelves. Officers from Atago police stations were ordered by Japan's National Police Agency to question the anime's producers about the show's contents and production process. An emergency meeting was held by the Ministry of Health, Labour and Welfare, in which the case was discussed with experts and information collected from hospitals. On the Tokyo Stock Exchange, shares in Nintendo (the company that publishes the games that the anime is based on) fell by 400 yen the following morning to 12,200 yen (almost 3.2%). The president of Nintendo, Hiroshi Yamauchi, said at a press conference the day after the episode had aired that the video game company was not responsible since the original Pokémon game for its Game Boy product was presented in black and white.

After the airing of "Dennō Senshi Porygon", the Pokémon anime went into a four-month hiatus. All 37 episodes of Pokémon: Indigo League were rerun on Kids Station in Tokyo leading up to the show's return on April 16, 1998, with airing of "Forest of Pikachu" ("Pikachu's Goodbye") and "The Four Eevee Brothers" ("The Battling Eevee Brothers"). After the hiatus, the time slot changed from Tuesday to Thursday. Several episodes (including the opening, credits, and "Dare da?" segments) were heavily edited to reduce flashing lights (with special emphasis on lightning that consumes the screen). Before broadcasting resumed, the special program  was shown. Broadcast in Japan on April 16, 1998, host Miyuki Yadama went over the circumstances of the program format and the on-screen advisories at the beginning of animated programs, as well as showing letters and fan drawings sent in by viewers, most of whom were concerned that the incident would lead to the anime being cancelled. Many Japanese television broadcasters and medical officials (along with the United Kingdom's Independent Television Commission) came together to find ways to make sure the incident was not repeated. They established a series of guidelines for future animated programs, including that flashing images, especially those with red, should not flicker faster than three times per second; if the image does not have red, it still should not flicker faster than five times per second; flashing images should not be displayed for a total duration of more than two seconds; and stripes, whirls and concentric circles should not take up a large part of the television screen.

The episode "Rougela's Christmas" ("Holiday Hi-Jynx"), which would have aired the following week, December 23, 1997, was pulled following the incident, and would not air until October 5, 1998. Airing out of order caused confusion to viewers because Ash still had a Charmander instead of Charizard, and Misty did not have Togepi yet, but Starmie and Horsea. Also, a New Year special that would have aired on December 30, 1997, was pulled and never resurfaced.

To prevent any similar incidents from occurring, the episode was pulled from circulation, and it has not aired since in any country. After the incident, TV broadcasters voluntarily added on-screen warnings to shows targeted at young children encouraging viewers to watch anime in a well-lit room and to sit far away from the television set. The anime has not featured Porygon or its evolutions, Porygon-2 and Porygon-Z, in any subsequent episodes outside of brief cameos, despite Pikachu being the one to cause the seizure-inducing strobe effect.

Cultural impact
The "Pokémon Shock" incident has been parodied many times in popular culture, including a 1999 episode of The Simpsons, "Thirty Minutes over Tokyo". In the episode, Bart watches an anime entitled Battling Seizure Robots featuring robots with flashing eye lasers, and asks: "Isn't this that cartoon that causes seizures?" The flashing eyes cause him, Marge, Lisa, and Homer to have seizures. The same scene is seen again in the episode's end credits, this time covering the entire screen.

An episode of South Park, "Chinpokomon", revolves around a Pokémon-like phenomenon, called Chinpokomon. Chinpokomon toys and video games are sold to children in South Park by a Japanese company. The company's president, Mr. Hirohito, uses the toys to brainwash the American children, making them into his own army to topple the "evil" American "empire". These toys included a video game in which the player attempts to bomb Pearl Harbor. While playing this game, Kenny has an epileptic seizure and later dies.

The incident was included in the 2004 edition and the 2008 Gamer's Edition of the Guinness World Records book, holding the record for "Most Photosensitive Epileptic Seizures Caused by a Television Show".

In So Yesterday, a 2004 novel by Scott Westerfeld, this episode is mentioned and shown to one of the characters. The flashing red light that caused the seizure is also used in the storytelling elements.

On September 19, 2020, the official Pokémon Twitter account referenced the episode, saying "Porygon did nothing wrong," in reference to the resulting explosion from Pikachu's Thunderbolt attack being the in-universe cause of the flashing lights, not Porygon. The tweet was deleted shortly thereafter, speculated to be because of the taboo subject matter.

See also

 List of Pokémon episodes
 Pokémon episodes removed from rotation – information on other Pokémon episode controversies
 YAT Anshin! Uchū Ryokō controversy – a similar incident
Burger King Pokémon container recall

Notes

References

External links
 

1997 anime
1997 controversies
1997 in Japanese television
1997 television episodes
Animation controversies in television
Anime and manga controversies
Articles containing video clips
December 1997 events in Asia
Mass psychogenic illness
Pokémon episodes
Television controversies in Japan
Television episodes pulled from general rotation